The End of the Obrenović Dynasty is а Serbian historical drama television miniseries which depicts events that led to the May Overthrow and assassination of the last Serbian king from the Obrenović dynasty, Alexander, and his close family.

Cast
Tihomir Stanić as King Alexander Obrenović
Ljiljana Blagojević as Queen Draga Obrenović
Miodrag Krivokapić as Đorđe Genčić
Aleksandar Srećković as Nikodije Lunjevica
Jelica Sretenović as Hristina Lunjevica
Vladan Gajović as Nikola Lunjevica 
Bojana Maljević as Vojka Lunjevica
Marko Nikolić as general Dimitrije Cincar-Marković 
Branko Jerinić as general Milovan Pavlović
Aljoša Vučković as general Laza Petrović
Nebojša Dugalić as lieutenant Antonije Antić
Siniša Ćopić as captain Dragutin Dimitrijević Apis
Andrija Maričić as captain Radomir Aranđelović
Lepomir Ivković as captain Mihajlo Ristić
Igor Pervić as captain Velimir Vemić
Petar Kralj as Nikola Pašić
Ivan Bekjarev as Boža Maršićanin
Branislav Jerinić as general Jovan Atanacković
Dušan Janjićijević as Jovan Avakumović
Boško Puletić as Živan Živanović
Ljiljana Dragutinović as Mrs Živanović
Miodrag Krstović as colonel Aleksandar Mašin
Miodrag Radovanović as Austrian ambassador Dumba
Stevo Žigon as Russian ambassador Charikov
Dušan Bulajić as general Leonida Solarević
Danilo Lazović as colonel Dimitrije Nikolić
Dušan Tadić as colonel Petar Mišić
Mirko Babić as major Milisav Živanović
Aleksandar Berček as King Milan Obrenović
Bata Živojinović as Aleksa Novaković
Jelena Žigon as Mrs Novaković
Mirko Bulović as Nikola Hadži-Toma

External links 
 

Historical television series
1995 Serbian television series debuts
Serbian drama television series
Radio Television of Serbia original programming
Serbian-language television shows
1990s Serbian television series
Obrenović dynasty
Films about royalty
Films about assassinations
1995 Serbian television series endings
Television shows set in Serbia
Television shows set in Belgrade
Television shows filmed in Serbia
Television shows filmed in Belgrade
Cultural depictions of Serbian monarchs
Works by Milovan Vitezović